Arjun Chakraborty is an Indian actor and director based in Kolkata.

He made his debut as an actor in the 1983 Hindi film Zara Si Zindagi, and his first major role was in the 1986 film Ankush starring Nana Patekar. Later he shifted mainly to the Bengali film industry starting with the 1989 film Kari Diye Kinlam. He made his directorial debut in 2008 with the film Tollylights.

Filmography
Arjun Chakraborty has acted in 13 feature films and has directed 1 film. His film My Karma directed by Korak Day earned him international recognition and was shown in most countries of the world, through various International Film Festivals.

Actor

Director

Television appearances
 The serial, Saheb Bibi Aur Ghulam also marks Raveena Tandon's television debut.              
Acted in popular TV serial "Bibah Abhijan".

References

External links

The Telegraph, India, Interview

Bengali male actors
Bengali film directors
Living people
20th-century Indian male actors
21st-century Indian male actors
Male actors from Kolkata
Film directors from Kolkata
Male actors in Hindi television
Indian male television actors
Year of birth missing (living people)